is a Japanese manga series written and illustrated by Wakō Honna. It is a spin-off of Honna's other manga series Nozoki Ana. It was serialized in Shogakukan's Shōnen Sunday S from March 2012 to February 2014, followed by a second part, serialized in Weekly Shōnen Sunday from May 2014 to April 2015. Its chapters were collected in eight tankōbon volumes. A three-episode original video animation produced by Zexcs was launched from August 2014 to February 2015.

Characters

Media

Manga
Nozo × Kimi, written and illustrated by Wakō Honna, is a spin-off of Honna's other manga Nozoki Ana. Honna published a 3-chapter series, titled , in Shogakukan's Weekly Shōnen Sunday from February 16 to March 2, 2011. Nozo × Kimi was serialized in Shogakukan's Shōnen Sunday S from March 25, 2012, to February 25, 2014. It was followed by a second part, which was serialized in Weekly Shōnen Sunday from May 28, 2014, to April 15, 2015. Shogakukan collected the chapters in eight tankōbon volumes, released from September 28, 2012, to June 18, 2015.

Volume list

Original video animation
A three–episode original video animation (OVA) adaptation was produced by Zexcs and directed by Masato Jinbo. The first episode was bundled with the special edition of manga's fourth volume, released on August 18, 2014. The second episode was bundled with the special edition of manga's fifth volume, released on November 18, 2014. The third and final episode was bundled with the special edition of manga's sixth volume, released on February 18, 2015.

In May 2021, Sentai Filmworks announced that they had licensed the OVA.

See also
Hada Camera, another manga series by the same author

References

External links
Manga official website at Web Sunday 
Anime official website 

OVAs based on manga
Romantic comedy anime and manga
Sentai Filmworks
Shogakukan manga
Shōnen manga
Zexcs